Nicolas Cilins (born 1985, France.) is an artist living in Geneva, Switzerland, working across the disciplines of visual arts, filmmaking, and performance art. His works are included as part of several public collections, such as the Institut für Film und Videokunst in Germany, the Fonds régional d'art contemporain in France, the Kunstmuseum Bern, the Fonds cantonal d'art contemporain, and the Fonds municipal d'art contemporain de Genève in Switzerland. Cilins became a laureate of the Swiss Art Awards in June 2018, and a laureate of the Geneva Art Awards in September 2020.

Education and career
Nicolas Cilins graduated with a Bachelor of Visual Arts from Villa Arson in 2007, before acquiring a diploma in performance art at the Haute École d'art et de design Genève (HEAD) in 2008. Cilins has long collaborated with French film editor Dominique Auvray and performance artist Yan Duyvendak. His work deals with cultural differences and social issues at the intersection of art, activism, and social change. He has also translated W. J. T. Mitchell’s seminal book, What Do Pictures Want?: The Lives and Loves of Images, into French.

Selected works

References

1985 births
Living people
French expatriates in Switzerland
French filmmakers
French artists
People from Cannes